The Goddess of Mercy Temple (also known as Kuan Im Teng or Kong Hock Keong) is a Chinese temple in the city of George Town in Penang, Malaysia. Situated at Pitt Street, it was first built in 1728, making it Penang's oldest Taoist temple.

The temple is dedicated to the Buddhist Bodhisattva of Mercy, Guan Yin. However, the temple had been originally established for the worship of Mazu, a sea deity. Following an influx of ethnic Chinese into George Town after the founding of the settlement in 1786, the temple transitioned into one dedicated to Guan Yin in 1800; by then, it also began to function as a neutral mediator between the rival Cantonese and Hokkien communities.

While the temple's more secular functions have since been passed on to the Penang Chinese Town Hall, it retains its religious significance and remains popular amongst Penangites of Chinese descent. It becomes a focal point for Chinese festivities such as the annual feast days for Guan Yin and the Jade Emperor's Birthday, attracting devotees from across Southeast Asia.

History 
The temple was founded in 1728. Built at a cost of $4,000 Spanish dollars, it was dedicated to Mazu, a sea goddess worshipped by the Hokkiens as a patron for seafarers. At the time, Penang Island was sparsely populated and the temple, built by the seafaring Hokkiens was located relatively closer to the sea. The temple was renovated in 1800, during which the temple's main deity was changed from Mazu to Guan Yin. Other Chinese deities, including Guan Yu and Tua Pek Kong, were also added into the temple, reflecting the more diverse Chinese community in George Town by that point. Decades of Chinese immigration since the founding of George Town by Captain Francis Light in 1786 had resulted in several Chinese dialect groups establishing themselves within the new settlement, including the Cantonese. The temple began to play the role as a mediator site in the increasingly frequent disputes between the Hokkiens and the Cantonese. In its early years, it was run by a committee that consisted of equal numbers from the two ethnic groups. Thus, the temple was able to serve as a council and a tribunal for Penang's Chinese community up until the mid-19th century.

The worsening feud between the various Chinese ethnic groups in George Town, which culminated in the Penang Riots of 1867, eventually led to the establishment of the Penang Chinese Town Hall in 1881 to take over the temple's more secular role as an arbiter for the local Chinese community. From then on, the temple serves a more religious purpose amongst the local Chinese. The temple has been rumoured to possess magical qualities, as it miraculously survived the several attacks on the temple since its inception in 1728. For instance, the temple remained unscathed when the Imperial Japanese Army (IJA) bombed and invaded Penang in December 1941, and survived a handful of other attacks before and during the 1960s. The temple was last renovated between 2012 and 2017.

Features 
Steeped in Chinese architecture, the temple features sweeping roofs typical of Chinese temples and has gigantic doors adorned with paintings of Taoist and Buddhist deities. Dragon-entwined pillars support the high roof as well, which is decorated with more dragon figurines at its top ridges. The temple is fronted by a large courtyard that faces Pitt Street to the east. It was built according to feng shui principles; it has three wells - one to the right of the main shrine, another at the front courtyard and the third hidden under the main altar of Guan Yin. The courtyard well is for public use, while the one beside the main shrine is reserved for monks. Urban legend has it that the water from the hidden well has medicinal properties.

Gallery

References

External links 
 

Chinese-Malaysian culture
Religious buildings and structures in Penang
Taoist temples in Malaysia
Tourist attractions in George Town, Penang
Guanyin temples
Religious buildings and structures completed in 1728